Boca de Lapa is a beach in the southeast of the island of São Vicente, Cape Verde. The waves are strong at this beach, which makes it popular with surfers, who call it "Sandy Beach". It is only accessible by   dirt road. It is 4.5 km south of Calhau.

References

External links
 Boca da Lapa on mindelo.info 

Beaches of Cape Verde
Geography of São Vicente, Cape Verde